The Swap is a British television crime drama series first broadcast on ITV1 in February 2002. The two-part serial stars Jemma Redgrave and Michael Maloney as a husband and wife who engage in a house swap with an Australian family for the Christmas holidays. However, the swap goes badly wrong and results in tragedy for both families involved. The serial achieved good viewing figures, upward of 8m.

The series was released on DVD on 4 April 2005.

Critical reception
Critical reception of the series was mostly positive.

Tony Purnell of The Mirror said;  "The highly original, two-part thriller was beautifully acted by Jemma Redgrave, Michael Maloney and Jonathan Cake. It kept me guessing and kept me on the edge of my seat, where I'll be again tonight for the conclusion."

Gerard O'Donovan of The Daily Telegraph said; "Marc Blake's nicely paced script and David Drury's stylish direction did a great job of translating a mundane, if deep-rooted, fear into an all too believable spine-chiller. Let's hope tonight's conclusion lives up to expectations."

However, Gareth McLean of The Guardian said of the series;  "In common with most middle-class people on television, Tom and Jen Forrester are awful. She is whiny, petulant and stupid and he is grumpy, brusque and priggish. Admittedly, we probably shouldn't take The Swap so seriously - what with it being such giddy hokum - but it would have been nice if it hadn't been quite so ridiculous."

Cast
 Jemma Redgrave as Jen Forrester
 Michael Maloney as Tom Forrester
 Jonathan Cake as Charles Anderson
 John McGlynn as DCI Knowles
 Lara Belmont as Lissa Forrester
 Tessa Churcher as Sarah Jenkins
 Cate Fowler as Henrietta Collins
 Phyllida Law as Rose Trenchard
 Rachel O'Meara as Doctor Derby

Episode list

References

 

ITV (TV network) original programming
2002 British television series debuts
2002 British television series endings
2000s British television miniseries
2000s British legal television series
English-language television shows
ITV television dramas
Films directed by David Drury